Rice Stadium may refer to:

 Rice Stadium (Rice University), football stadium on the Rice University campus in Houston, Texas
 Robert Rice Stadium, football stadium on the University of Utah campus in Salt Lake City, now called Rice-Eccles stadium
 Wendel D. Ley Track and Holloway Field, formerly known as Rice Track/Soccer Stadium